In mathematics, the Browder–Minty theorem (sometimes called the Minty–Browder theorem) states that a bounded, continuous, coercive and monotone function T from a real, separable reflexive Banach space X into its continuous dual space X∗ is automatically surjective. That is, for each continuous linear functional g ∈ X∗, there exists a solution u ∈ X of the equation T(u) = g. (Note that T itself is not required to be a linear map.)

The theorem is named in honor of Felix Browder and George J. Minty, who independently proved it.

See also

 Pseudo-monotone operator; pseudo-monotone operators obey a near-exact analogue of the Browder–Minty theorem.

References

  (Theorem 10.49)

Banach spaces
Theorems in functional analysis
Operator theory